Casa is a surname. Notable people with the surname include:

 Christophe Casa (born 1957), French professional tennis player
 David Casa (born 1968),  Maltese politician and Member of the European Parliament
 Giovanni della Casa (1503 – 1556), Florentine poet, writer on etiquette and society, diplomat, and inquisitor

See also 
 Casa (disambiguation)
 Casas (surname)